Events in 1970 in Japanese television.

Debuts

Ongoing shows
Music Fair, music (1964-present)
Key Hunter, drama (1968–1973)
Tiger Mask, anime (1969-1971)
Attack No. 1, anime (1969–1971)
Mito Kōmon, jidaigeki (1969-2011)
Sazae-san, anime (1969-present)

Endings

See also
1970 in anime
1970 in Japan
List of Japanese films of 1970

References